Parliamentary elections were held in Iran in 1961, after the elections the previous year had been annulled by the Shah. The result was a victory for the Party of Nationalists, which won majority of the seats.

National Front candidates had been forcibly prevented from campaigning, such as  Boroumand in Isfahan. Among opposition, only Allahyar Saleh was able to win a seat in his native Kashan.

Results

Zonis (1971) and Mehrdad (1980)

Chehabi (1990)

Nohlen et al. (2001)

References

1961 elections in Asia
1961 elections in Iran
National Consultative Assembly elections
Lower house elections in Iran
January 1961 events in Asia
February 1961 events in Asia